This list of Saint Leo University alumni includes graduates, non-graduate former students, and current students of Saint Leo University and its predecessor, Saint Leo College Preparatory School, as well as Holy Name Academy.

|}

References

Saint Leo University alumni

Saint Leo University